Velvet Moonlight is a Brazilian heavy metal band, formed in São Paulo in 2013 by vocalist Tuuh Wilson and his brother, guitarist Oddy Silva. after creating the music Flying Horse. Tuuh was the lead vocalist of an anime band called Sugoi (2010–2013), but left the band and created Velvet Moonlight. Later, the ex-drummer from Sugoi, Cidão, and ex-bassist from Triforce, Death, joined the band.

History 

At the end of 2013, Sugoi disbanded with an announcement from Tuuh: "Sugoi is over, but the sound continued. From now, I will be playing with Cidão in a new band called: Velvet Moonlight". Tuuh and his brother, Oddy, were working behind the scenes creating new music. Together, they recorded and released the song "Flying Horse". Cidão and Death joined the band for its first EP, Flying Horse: the Dawn of a Man – A Side, with five tracks. Within one day of its release, the EP reached one thousand downloads.

Members 

 Tuuh Wilson – Vocal
 Oddy Silva – Guitar
 Death – Bass
 Melk – Drumm
 Refe - Keyboard

Albums

Flying Horse: the Dawn of a Man 

The EP talks about an heroic Perseu and his human side. But, how do these acts appear today?

 "Flying Horse" (5'12)—A song about the meeting of Perseu and his war companion, Pegasus.
 Desert Chaos (3'59)— Philosophical reflection on incessant and exhausting wars of Perseus.
 Red Fields (5'34)—Desire for freedom, happiness, but the harsh reality and bloody pursues its objectives.
 Dreamless Soldier (5'12)—Uncertainty than actually follow, if you really should have a dream beyond Perseus of endless fights. Not wishing or even to your worst enemy, the pain in your heart.
 Perseu's Father (5'02)—Final words of his father, advice about life, and what really follow. Which way to go. How hard is the life.

External links 

 
 

Brazilian heavy metal musical groups
Musical groups established in 2013
2013 establishments in Brazil